South Carolina Highway 346 (SC 346) is a  state highway in Kershaw County, in the northern part of the U.S. state of South Carolina. Except within Bethune, it travels through rural wooded areas of the Sandhills region of the state.

Route description
SC 346 has its southern terminus at an intersection with SC 341 (Main Street N) in the town of Bethune. It travels northeast along Hampton Street before curving more to the north after one block. After exiting the town, the highway generally parallels the Lynches River whilst traveling in the northeastern section of Kershaw County. Outside of the town, the road passes through mostly pine forests though it also passes in front of some houses and farms. It winds its way around some ponds and passes some churches along its route. Nearing its northern terminus, it heads around the east side of a sand and gravel quarry and intersects SC 157 at its northern terminus. About  later, SC 346 ends at a four-way intersection with SC 903.

Major intersections

See also

References

External links

SC 346 at Virginia Highways' South Carolina Highways Annex

346
Transportation in Kershaw County, South Carolina